The SIAI S.22 was an Italian racing flying boat, built by SIAI for the 1921 Schneider Trophy race.

Design and development
The S.22 was a single-seat twin-engine biplane flying boat. Its two  Isotta Fraschini V.6bis engines were mounted on eight struts above the hull and below the upper wing, driving two propellers, one in tractor configuration and one in pusher configuration.

Operational history
During test flights over Lake Maggiore prior to the 1921 Schneider trophy races, the S.22 crashed into the lake, ending the hope that it would represent Italy in the race.

Operators

Specifications

See also

Notes

References

Aviation: SIAI racing seaplanes

S.22
1920s Italian sport aircraft
Flying boats
Schneider Trophy
Twin-engined push-pull aircraft
Biplanes
Aircraft first flown in 1921